David Najem (Dari: داوید نجم; born May 26, 1992) is a professional footballer who plays as a defender for USL Championship club New Mexico United and the Afghanistan national team.

Najem grew up in Clifton, New Jersey and attended Paramus Catholic High School, where he set school career records for both goals and points.

Career

Early career
Najem was a member of the New York Red Bulls Academy since the age of 14 and played with the U-23 team during his college career. He attended Paramus Catholic High School, where he captained the team for two seasons and set the school record for career goals scored with 54. In 2010, Najem enrolled at Columbia University, and played four seasons with the men's soccer team. During his senior year in 2013, he was awarded as the Ivy League Offensive player of the year, tallying five goals and six assists.

Eintracht Bamberg
After graduating from Columbia, Najem went on trial with lower division clubs in Germany and eventually signed with FC Eintracht Bamberg from the Regionalliga Bayern league in 2014.

New York Red Bulls II
On May 19, 2016, Najem returned to the United States to sign with New York Red Bulls II. Najem will partner up with manager, John Wolyniec who formerly played for the New York Red Bulls and coached him in the academy. Najem made his official debut for the club coming on as a late match substitute in a 1–0 victory against FC Montreal. After starting in every match during the clubs playoff run, on October 23, 2016, Najem helped the club to a 5–1 victory over Swope Park Rangers in the 2016 USL Cup Final.

Tampa Bay Rowdies
Najem signed with the Tampa Bay Rowdies on January 11, 2018.

New Mexico United
In January 2020, Najem joined New Mexico United.

International
He made his debut for Afghanistan national football team on June 7, 2019 in a friendly against Tajikistan, as a starter.

Personal life 
David's brother, Adam, is also a professional footballer.

Career statistics

Club statistics

International statistics

Honors

Club
New York Red Bulls II
USL Cup: 2016

References

External links

1992 births
Living people
Afghan footballers
Afghanistan international footballers
American people of Afghan descent
American soccer players
Association football midfielders
Columbia Lions men's soccer players
Columbia College (New York) alumni
New York Red Bulls II players
People from Livingston, New Jersey
Soccer players from New Jersey
Sportspeople from Clifton, New Jersey
Sportspeople from Essex County, New Jersey
Sportspeople of Afghan descent
Tampa Bay Rowdies players
USL Championship players
Paramus Catholic High School alumni
New Mexico United players